Synanthedon cephiformis is a moth of the family Sesiidae. It is found in Central Europe and Eastern Europe.

The wingspan is 17–22 mm. Adults are on wing from June to August.

The larvae feed within galls caused by Melampsorelle caryophyllacearum and Aecidium elatinum on Abies alba, Picea excelsa, Larix decidua and Juniperus communis.

References

External links
Lepiforum.de

Moths described in 1808
Sesiidae
Moths of Europe
Taxa named by Ferdinand Ochsenheimer